Two ships of the Royal Navy have been named HMS Sweetbriar :

  an  sloop launched in 1917 and sold in 1927
 , a  launched in 1941 and sold in 1946

Royal Navy ship names